The Strasbourg Agreement of 27 August 1675 is the first international agreement banning the use of chemical weapons. The treaty was signed between France and the Holy Roman Empire, and was created in response to the use of poisoned bullets. The use of this weaponry was preceded by Leonardo da Vinci's invention of arsenic and sulfur-packed shells that can be fired against ships. These weapons had been used by Christoph Bernhard von Galen, Bishop of Munster, in the Siege of Groningen (1672) - thus provoking the Strasbourg Agreement between the belligerents of the Eighty Years' War.

The Hague Convention of 1899 also contained a provision that rejected the use of projectiles capable of diffusing asphyxiating or deleterious gases. The next major agreement on chemical weapons did not occur until the 1925 Geneva Protocol. Today, the prohibition on the use of chemical weapons is different from the use of poison as a method of warfare and is particularly noted by the International Committee of the Red Cross as existing independent of each other.

See also
 1874 Brussels conference (no accord, but recommended banning the use of poisonous or poisoned weapons)
 Hague Declaration of 1899 (outlawing "the use of projectiles the sole object of which is the diffusion of asphyxiating or deleterious gases.")
 1919 Treaty of Versailles

References

"Chemical Weapons and the Chemical Weapons Convention"
Clarke, Robin (1968), We all Fall Down: The Prospect of Biological and Chemical Warfare (London: Allen Lane; The Penguin Press).
Hersh, Seymour M. (1968), Chemical and Biological Weapons: America's Hidden Arsenal (Indianapolis: The Bobbs-Merrill Company).

Arms control treaties
Treaties of the Kingdom of France
Treaties of the Holy Roman Empire
Chemical warfare
1675 in France
1675 in the Holy Roman Empire
1675 in military history
1675 treaties
France–Holy Roman Empire relations